Amei Wallach is a filmmaker, art critic journalist, and author from New York. Her documentaries profiling artists include: Louise Bourgeois: The Spider, The Mistress and the Tangerine (2008), Ilya and Emilia Kabakov: Enter Here (2013), and Taking Venice: The Rauschenberg Factor. Her writings have appeared in the New York Times, Smithsonian, Vanity Fair, and Art in America, and numerous publications. From 2000 to 2005, Wallach served as president of the U.S. Section of the International Association of Art Critics (AICA/USA).

Early life and education
Amei Wallach was raised in Goshen, Connecticut by German-Jewish immigrants.

Wallach graduated from the George School, a private boarding high school, in Newton, Bucks County, Pennsylvania. Wallach attended the University of Chicago, withdrew to pursue acting in New York, and completed her Bachelor of Science at the Columbia University School of General Studies.

Family
Her mother Gerda Wilhelmina Lewenz (April 7, 1915 – October 12, 2000) was born in Berlin, Germany in the middle of World War I. Both sides of Gerda's family were "prominent" Jewish bankers. Gerda was "deeply" involved in the German peace movement and was a peace activist the rest of her life. Dinner table contests took place over who was the greatest writer; all of her children would become researchers, and published authors. Gerda studied art history in Florence, Italy; in the U.S. she would own the Litchfield Gallery, and continued to curate art shows throughout her life. Back in Germany near the start of World War II she became a nurse, where she met and married Dr. Gert M.K. (GMK) Wallach who was also a German Jew.

In 1938, they separately fled to Goshen. Gert opened a doctor's office, and served as Director of Health for Goshen, for which he received a Public Health Award. He later took a position as health officer and as clinician based in Chattanooga, Tennessee for the Georgia-Tennessee Health Authority serving Appalachia. Gerda also continued her work as a nurse. Before she died she was featured in the documentary Letter Without Words (1998), a PBS film about her family's life in Germany from World War I (1914-1918) to World War II (1939-1945).

Amei Wallach had two siblings. Wendell Wallach attended Harvard Divinity School. H.G. Peter Wallach was an author and "political scientist specializing in American Constitutional law, and contemporary German politics", who died in 1985.

Career
Wallach worked as Chief Art Critic for Newsday and New York Newsday from 1984 to 1995, and was an on-air arts essayist for the McNeil-Lehrer NewsHour, later renamed PBS NewsHour, from 1987 to 1995. As an art critic, Wallach's articles have appeared in The New York Times, The New York Times Magazine, The Nation, Smithsonian, Vanity Fair, Vogue, Art in America, ARTnews, Aperture, Parkett and The Brooklyn Rail.

Wallach has interviewed and profiled artists ranging from Salvador Dalí to Willem de Kooning. She profiled Anselm Kiefer in 1988, David Hammons in 1991, and in October 2001 Wallach's essay on the Iranian-born artist Shirin Neshat was featured in Art in America.

From 2000 to 2005, Wallach was president of AICA/USA, the U.S. Section of the International Association of Art Critics , or Association Internationale des Critiques d'Art, and as of 2020, continues on its board. She also serves on the board of CEC ArtsLink, and was a founding member of ArtTable, an association of leading women in the arts. Wallach is the founding director of The Art Writing Workshop; a partnership between the International Art Critics Association (AICA/USA) and the Creative Capital Warhol Foundation Arts Writers Grant Program.

Film work
In 2008 Wallach co-directed and co-produced Louise Bourgeois: The Spider, the Mistress, and the Tangerine with Marion Cajori. Filmed over 14 years (from 1993 to 2007), the work is a documentary portrait of the sculptor Louise Bourgeois and her career, which spanned the 20th and early 21st century. The New York Times called the film a "Superb documentary portrait", and it garnered a positive review from The Seattle Times.

In 2013 Wallach directed Ilya and Emilia Kabakov: Enter Here, which debuted at the New York Film Forum, and had its Canadian premiere at the Vancouver International Film Festival. Beginning in the Ukraine under Joseph Stalin, the film culminates in 2008 with the artists’ first public exhibition in Moscow, in venues throughout the city, including the Pushkin Museum.

Her latest documentary film, Taking Venice: The Rauschenberg Factor, examines the United States' efforts to ensure that, through Robert Rauschenberg, the Golden Lion top prize of the 1964 Venice Biennale would go to America.

Personal life 
In 1972, Wallach married Charles F. Tebo, who was a group product manager with Lever Brothers’ New York branch. Her brother Wendell helped to officiate. The marriage ended in divorce.

Wallach married again in September 1989 to William P. Edwards, chief executive officer of the Museum Store Company, a gift store chain. This was a second marriage for both parties.

Wendell Wallach, her brother, is a lecturer at Yale University’s Interdisciplinary Center for Bioethics, and chair of the technology and ethics study group.

Works

Books
 Ilya Kabakov: The Man Who Never Threw Anything Away
 Reflections of Nature: Paintings by Joseph Raffael'
 Gee's Bend: The Architecture of the Quilt
 Louise Bourgeois

Films
 Louise Bourgeois: The Spider, the Mistress, and the Tangerine with Marion Cajori.
 Ilya and Emilia Kabakov: Enter Here.
 Taking Venice: The Rauschenberg Factor, in process.

Awards
Wallach was awarded the National Endowment for the Arts Professional Journalism Fellowship at Stanford University, later renamed the John S. Knight Fellowship, in 1984.

In 2006, Wallach won a "Best Show in a Temporary or Alternative Space" award for her exhibition Neo-Sincerity: The Difference Between the Comic and the Cosmic Is a Single Letter, from the International Art Critics Association/USA.

References 

Year of birth missing (living people)
Living people
American documentary filmmakers
American writers
Columbia University School of General Studies alumni
Date of birth missing (living people)